Techonomy Media Inc. is an American conference and media company founded in 2011 and headquartered in New York, NY. Techonomy organizes the annual invitation-only thought leadership Techonomy conference, which focuses on how the accelerating advancement of technology is transforming business and can help address the world's pressing needs. It is led by David Kirkpatrick, a former technology editor of Fortune. Business and tech executives such as Bill Gates of Microsoft, and Ray Kurzweil and Eric Schmidt of Google have all participated. Its current advisory board consists of Marc Benioff of Salesforce.com, Jack Dorsey of Twitter and Square, Reid Hoffman of LinkedIn, and Padmasree Warrior of Cisco, among others.

Background 
Techonomy's name combines "technology" and "economy" to suggest that technology is entwined with society. The company's events and media generally argue that tech, if applied productively, can result in tremendous social progress. The company's programs discuss how businesses in almost every industry are faced with the choice of adapting to take advantage of technology or being rendered extinct as the pace of change quickens.

The first Techonomy conference, in 2010, was organized by a partnership that included Kirkpatrick along with former Fortune editors Peter Petre and Brent Schlender, as well as Michael Christman and Carrie Van Heyst. Techonomy Media was created in early 2011 to continue the annual conference and develop  editorial content, including video journalism. Simone Ross, former program director for Fortune's conference division, served as program director for the initial Techonomy conference in 2010, and co-founded Techonomy Media as COO and Chief Program Officer for the company. Michael Federle also was a co-founder of the company. Forbes Media, which includes Forbes and Forbes.com, became a minority investor in the company in July 2011.

Events

Techonomy Flagship Conferences 
 2010: Lake Tahoe in Truckee, California
 2011: Tucson, Arizona
 Revolutions in Progress — The growing mismatch between the desires and capabilities of technology-empowered individuals and the habits and practices of the institutions, corporations and governments that serve them.
 2012: Tucson, Arizona
 Insurgency and Opportunity: Companies, Countries, and Communities
 2013: Tucson, Arizona
 The Business of Revolution
 2014: Half Moon Bay, California

Techonomy Detroit 
 2012: Detroit
Participants: Angela Benton, Steve Case, Jack Dorsey, Timothy C. Draper, Justin Fox, Dan Gilbert, Bruce J. Katz, David Kirkpatrick, Vivek Kundra, Josh Linkner, Carlo Ratti, Michael Teitelbaum
 2013: Detroit
 Competitiveness, Jobs, and the Urban Future in an Age of Technology — The national challenge of inadequate and inequitable education.
Participants: Jocelyn Benson, Rodney Brooks, Jean Case, Emily Chang, John Wm. Covington, Jack Dorsey, Keith Ferrazzi, Dan Gilbert, Bruce J. Katz, David Kirkpatrick, Josh Linkner, Edward Luce, Larry Morrissey, Marlin Page, Hector Ruiz, Rick Snyder, M. Roy Wilson
 2014: Detroit
Participants: Jocelyn Benson, Jean Case, Susan P. Crawford, Dickson Despommier, Jack Dorsey, Justin Fox, Dan Gilbert, Andrew Keen, David Kirkpatrick, Josh Linkner, Arun Sundararajan, Philip D. Zelikow

Techonomy Lab 
 2013: Menlo Park

Techonomy Campus 
 2013: Tel Aviv

Techonomy Bio 
 2015: Mountain View, California
Participants: Marc Benioff, Walter De Brouwer, Drew Endy, Juan Enríquez, David Kirkpatrick, Terry Sejnowski

Techonomy Policy 
 2015: Washington, DC
Participants: Cory Booker, Julie Brill, Steve Case, Vint Cerf, Fadi Chehade, Michael R. Cote, Victoria Espinel, Deb Fischer, Brian Forde, Shane Harris, David Kirkpatrick, Jinyoung Lee Englund, Peter L. Levin, Craig Mundie, Nuala O'Connor, Michael O'Rielly, David O'Sullivan, Sean Parker, Andrew Rasiej, Jessica Rosenworcel, Miriam Sapiro, Arun Sundararajan, Philip D. Zelikow.

References 

Mass media companies of the United States